Türkgözü (formerly: Badele) is a village in the Posof District, Ardahan Province, Turkey. Its population is 175 (2021). It is a border crossing point to Vale in Georgia.

The residents of Türkgözü are Kipchaks, descendants of  Turkic people from Central Asia, who came to the place from Akhaltsikhe region in the 18th century. In the past, many people left the village for economic reasons. With the opening of the border checkpoint in 1997, the emigration came to an end. Currently, 70 families live in the village.

A number of historical structures in the village, among them churches and graveyards, point to the early settlement of the place, which was formerly called Badele.

The village is set up on a plain that separates Kodiyan Plateau from Kobliyan Valley. The Posof Creek, running south-east of the village, forms part of the border to Georgia. There are three lakes around the settlement. Neighboring villages of Türkgözü in Turkey are Armutveren and Sarıdarı. The road D.955 (European route E691) from Ardahan to Damal passes through Türkgözü.

The economy of the settlement relies mainly on agriculture, livestock, beekeeping and trade. The place is widely known for its "Badele apples".

Notable natives 
Oğuz Atalay, professor and rector of Izmir University
Kemal İrfan Akkuş, former director general of Labor and Employment Relations Agency of Turkey

References 

Georgia (country)–Turkey border crossings
Geography of Ardahan Province
Villages in Posof District